NaturBornholm, located in Aakirkeby, is an interpretive centre on the Danish island of Bornholm. It is dedicated to the geology and natural history of the island. It was inaugurated on 16 May 2000.

Design
The museum was designed by Henning Larsen. The building employs gabions. This technique, though originating in engineering, was popularized by Herzog and de Meuron in their design of the Domus Winery in Napa Valley.

Exhibition

See also
 GeoCenter Møns Klint
 Skagen Odde Nature Centre

References

External links

 Official website
 Blog post on the architecture

Museums in Bornholm
Museums established in 2000
2000 establishments in Denmark
Geology of Denmark
Museums in the Capital Region of Denmark
Nature centers in Denmark
Natural history museums in Denmark